Longtou is a town in Changning County, in southeastern Sichuan province, China, located at the edge of the Sichuan Basin. , it has two residential communities (社区) and 14 villages under its administration.

References 

Township-level divisions of Sichuan